Becke Moui is a town in Saint David Parish, Grenada.  It is located at the southern end of the island, along the southern coast.

References 

Populated places in Grenada